The 1990 Pepsi Hotshots season was the 1st season of the franchise in the Philippine Basketball Association (PBA).

Expansion pool

 Pepsi won the toss over Pop Cola to pick first, both teams took turns in choosing players

Draft picks

New ballclub
Newcomer Pepsi Cola had a forgettable campaign in their first year of participation in the PBA. The Hotshots finished with a lowly 2-28 record with two wins coming at the hands of fellow expansion team Pop Cola.

The Hotshots scored their first win in the opening game of the season on February 18 with a rousing 149-130 victory over importless Pop Cola Sizzlers. Pepsi Import Derrick Hamilton scored 77 big points.  They lost the rest of their nine outings in the first conference and their first six matches in the All-Filipino. On July 3, the Hotshots finally broke the long slump of a 15-game losing streak with a come-from-behind 117-111 win over Pop Cola. 

Former Hills Bros. import Jose Slaughter came back in the Third Conference to replaced Alyun Taylor, who was only good for two games. Slaughter teamed up with Jeff Hodge and the Hotshots failed to score a single victory and were shut out in 10 games in the eliminations.

Occurrences
San Miguel assistant coach Derrick Pumaren accepted the offer to coach the Pepsi Hotshots, replacing Ed Ocampo at the start of the Third Conference. The Hotshots acquired veteran center Abet Guidaben, who was traded by Alaska in exchange for Harmon Codiñera.

Roster

Transactions

Additions

Trades

Recruited imports

References

TNT Tropang Giga seasons
Pepsi